The 1977 World Table Tennis Championships men's singles was the 34th edition of the men's singles championship. 

Mitsuru Kono defeated Kuo Yao-hua in the final, winning three sets to one to secure the title.

Results

See also
List of World Table Tennis Championships medalists

References

-